Cecil Taylor Nichols (born March 3, 1959) is an American actor. He is known for roles in the Whit Stillman films Metropolitan, Barcelona, The Last Days of Disco, and Damsels in Distress. His characters in the first three of these films were insecure, stuttering sidekicks to those of the more outgoing Chris Eigeman. Nichols and Eigeman also played minor roles in the independent film The Next Step, released in 1997, of which Nichols was an associate producer.

Career
Nichols has also appeared in the films Boiler Room, Congo, The American President, The Big Easy, and Jurassic Park III, as well as episodes of the TV series Murder, She Wrote, NewsRadio, Chicago Hope, ER, Man of the People, Judging Amy, The Mind of the Married Man, CSI: Crime Scene Investigation, 24, Criminal Minds, The Mentalist, Bones, and Double Rush.  In 2007 Nichols appeared in the film The Air I Breathe. He can also be seen in the 2018 film Chappaquiddick.

Personal life
Nichols was born in East Lansing, Michigan. He has been married since 1995 to Margarita de Eguilior, a Spanish woman he met during the production of Barcelona. They have two daughters, Alexandra, who was born January 21, 1999, and Lee, born January 30, 2002.

Filmography

Metropolitan (1990) as Charlie Black
Barcelona (1994) as Ted Boynton
Dirty Money (1995) as Herb
Headless Body in Topless Bar (1995) as Danny
Congo (1995) as Jeffrey Weems
Serpent's Lair (1995) as Paul Douglas
The American President (1995) as Stu
Best Wishes Mason Chadwick (1995) as Mason Chadwick
The Next Step (1997) as Peter
Cadillac (1997) as Todd
Born Bad (1997) as Agent Rickman
The Last Days of Disco (1998) as Charlie / Ted Boynton
Mixed Blessings (1998) as Rob
Gideon (1998) as Dr. Richard Willows
The Sex Monster (1999) as Billy
Serious Business (1999) as Bradford
Boiler Room (2000) as Harry Reynard
Mercury in Retrograde (2000) as Alex
Jurassic Park III (2001) as Mark Degler
CSI: Crime Scene Investigation (2004, TV Series) as Kevin Greer aka "The Blue Painted Killer"
Age of Kali (2005) as Tom Watson
The Air I Breathe (2007) as Sorrow's Father
 Criminal Minds (2007) as William Reid
Case 219 (2010) as Richard Ewing
Black Mail (2010) as Lee Burrows
Damsels in Distress (2011) as Professor Black
Hide Away (2011) as The Boss
Freeloaders (2012) as Kyle
Godzilla (2014) as Military Analyst
Bipolar (2014) as Donald Poole
Bestseller (2015) as Agent Hayes
40 Nights (2016) as Joseph
Chappaquiddick (2017) as Ted Sorensen
1BR (2019) as Jerry
The Walking Dead (2020) as Jeremiah

References

External links 
 

1959 births
Living people
20th-century American male actors
21st-century American male actors
American male film actors
American male television actors
Male actors from Louisville, Kentucky
People from East Lansing, Michigan
Male actors from Michigan